Amor Yonas Layouni (born 3 October 1992) is a Tunisian professional footballer who plays as a forward or winger for Australian club Western Sydney Wanderers on loan from Norwegian club Vålerenga and the Tunisia national team.

Club career
Layouni was born in Sweden. He made his senior debut for Elverum on 9 April 2017 against Tromsdalen; Elverum draw 1–1. He signed for Eliteserien side Bodø/Glimt in the summer on 2017. On 17 September 2019 Layouni signed for Egyptian side Pyramids FC on a three-year contract.

On his debut for the Western Sydney Wanderers, Layouni scored the equalizer in the 5th minute of extra time to end the game at 4-4 against Adelaide United.

International career
Layouni was born in Sweden and is of Tunisian descent. He debuted for the Tunisia national team in a 1–0 friendly win over Mauritania on 6 September 2019, scoring the game-winning goal. He was called up back to the Tunisia national team by head coach Jalel Kadri for their 2 friendly matches against Libya on 16 march 2023.

Career statistics

Club

Scores and results list Tunisia's goal tally first.

References

1992 births
Living people
Tunisian footballers
Tunisia international footballers
Swedish footballers
Swedish people of Tunisian descent
Tunisian Jews
IK Brage players
Degerfors IF players
Superettan players
Elverum Fotball players
Norwegian First Division players
Eliteserien players
Association football midfielders
FK Bodø/Glimt players
Pyramids FC players
Vålerenga Fotball players
Western Sydney Wanderers FC players
Swedish expatriate footballers
Tunisian expatriate footballers
Expatriate footballers in Norway
Swedish expatriate sportspeople in Norway
Tunisian expatriate sportspeople in Norway
Expatriate footballers in Egypt
Tunisian expatriate sportspeople in Egypt